43rd Battalion may refer to:

 43rd Battalion (Australia), an infantry battalion of the Australian Imperial Force that served during World War I
 2/43rd Battalion (Australia), an infantry battalion of the Second Australian Imperial Force that served during World War II
 43rd (6th (City) Battalion, The Royal Northumberland Fusiliers) Royal Tank Regiment, a unit of the United Kingdom Army 
 43rd Battalion Virginia Cavalry, also known as "Mosby's Rangers", a unit of the Confederate (Southern) Army during the American Civil War
 43rd Signal Battalion (United States), a unit of the United States Army 
 43rd Battalion (Cameron Highlanders of Canada), CEF

See also
 43rd Division (disambiguation)
 43rd Group (disambiguation)
 43rd Brigade (disambiguation)
 43rd Regiment (disambiguation)
 43rd Squadron (disambiguation)